The Hamrin oil field is an oil field located in Basra Governorate. It was discovered in 1950 and developed by Basrah Oil Company. It began production in 1960 and produces oil.

References

Oil fields of Iraq